The National Museum of Musical Instruments is situated in the Palazzina Samoggia in Rome. The museum, owned by the MIBACT since December 2014 is one of 43 museums pertaining to the Polo museale del Lazio. The museum had 9,164 visitors in 2015.

See also 
 List of music museums

References

Museums in Rome
Musical instrument museums in Italy
National museums of Italy
Music museums in Italy